Dolice  (formerly ) is a village in Stargard County, West Pomeranian Voivodeship, in north-western Poland. It is the seat of the gmina (administrative district) called Gmina Dolice.

The village has a population of 2,000.

References

Dolice